Tubullela is a problematic genus known from the Middle Cambrian Burgess Shale. 118 specimens of Tubullela are known from the Greater Phyllopod bed, where they comprise 0.22% of the community.

References 

Burgess Shale fossils
Enigmatic prehistoric animal genera